Xima is a town under the administration of Longli County, Guizhou, China. , it has 3 residential communities and 11 villages under its administration.

References

Township-level divisions of Guizhou
Longli County